Osmo Tapio Jussila (14 March 1938 in Haukipudas – 15 March 2019), was a Finnish historian.

Jussila was 1980-83 assistant professor in political history at Helsinki University and professor 1983-2001. He had in his research treated foremost the Finland–Russia relations. Suomen tie 1944-1948 is a research about the acts of the Finnish communist party after the second world war.

Publications 
 Nationalismi ja vallankumous venäläis-suomalaisissa suhteissa 1899-1914 (1979)
 Terijoen hallitus 1939-40 (1985)
 Suomen tie 1944-1948 (1990)

References 
 Uppslagsverket Finland, 2 (2004)

1938 births
2019 deaths
People from Haukipudas
20th-century Finnish historians